In Arabic onomastics ("nisbah"), Al-Basri denotes a relationship to or from  Basra and may refer to:
Ibn Hisham (died 833), Abu Muhammad 'Abd al-Malik bin Hisham ibn Ayyub al-Himyari al-Mu'afiri al-Baṣri, biographer of Muhammad
Ibn al-Haytham (  965 – c. 1040),  Arab mathematician, astronomer, and physicist 
Hasan al-Basri (642–728),  Muslim preacher, ascetic, theologian, exegete, scholar, judge, and mystic
Rabiah al-Basri (c. 714–801),  Muslim saint and Sufi mystic
Saleem Al-Basri (1926–1997), Iraqi actor and comedian actress
Abu al-Husayn al-Basri (died 1044),  Mu'tazilite theologian and expert in Islamic jurisprudence
Ammar al-Basri (died 845), East Syriac theologian and apologist. 
Al-Jahiz (776 – c.868), Abū ʿUthman ʿAmr ibn Baḥr al-Kinānī al-Baṣrī